Honnedaga Lake is a lake in the Adirondack Mountains of the U.S. state of New York. It was originally called Jocks Lake or Transparent Lake; the name was later changed to Honnedaga, a local Indian word said to mean "clear waters" or "calm waters". The closest village is Atwell, New York.

References

Lakes of New York (state)